The Round Valley War was an 1887 conflict between American Colonists and Yuki Indians on the Round Valley Indian Tribes of the Round Valley Reservation in California. The conflict started as colonists were beginning to encroach on reservation lands, making the already difficult circumstances for the Yuki people who had been placed there following the Mendocino War even more unfavourable. The Federal Office of Indian Affairs moved to have the trespassing settlers evicted. The settlers turned to local authorities and the Sheriff of Mendocino arrested the federal officer who had filed the accusations against the settlers.

Bibliography
 
Adams, K., & Schneider, K. (2011). " Washington is a Long Way Off": The" Round Valley War" and the Limits of Federal Power on a California Indian Reservation. Pacific Historical Review, 80(4), 557-596.
Oandasan, W. (1982). Ukomno'm: The Yuki Indians of Northern California, a Review Essay. By Virginia P. Miller. American Indian Culture and Research Journal, 6(4), 95-104.
Carranco, L., & Beard, E. (1981). Genocide and Vendetta: The Round Valley Wars of Northern California. Norman, OK: University of Oklahoma Press.
Madley, B. (2004). Patterns of frontier genocide 1803–1910: the Aboriginal Tasmanians, the Yuki of California, and the Herero of Namibia. Journal of Genocide Research, 6(2), 167-192.

1880s in the United States
Conflicts in 1887
Native American history of California
Wars involving the United States
History of California
Wars between the United States and Native Americans
Indian wars of the American Old West
History of Mendocino County, California
Wars involving the indigenous peoples of North America in California
1887 in California